Qiu Hongxia (born 10 February 1982) is a Chinese weightlifter.

Qiu participated in the women's -53 kg class at the 2006 World Weightlifting Championships and won the gold medal, snatching 98 kg and clean and jerking an additional 128 kg for a total of 226 kg. With these lifts, she held the world records in the clean and jerk, and still holds one for the total in the women's 53 kg class.

References

Living people
1982 births
Chinese female weightlifters
World record setters in weightlifting
Place of birth missing (living people)
World Weightlifting Championships medalists
20th-century Chinese women
21st-century Chinese women